LUMO Community Wildlife Sanctuary is a community owned wildlife sanctuary in Kenya. It is located near Mwatate in Taita-Taveta County in the former Coast Province, approximately 220km from Mombasa.  It covers an area of 48,000 acres. The sanctuary is formed by the  Lualenyi, Mramba Communal Grazing Area, and Oza Group Ranch, hence the acronym "LUMO". 

LUMO Community Wildlife Sanctuary is adjacent to Tsavo West National Park and the Taita Hills Wildlife Sanctuary.It hosts cape buffalo, elephant, leopard, masai lion, masai giraffe, zebra, hartebeest, impala, waterbuck, Thomson's gazelle, lesser kudu, dik-dik, and other smaller animals, including a great diversity of birdlife.  

The sanctuary has one community-owned tourist lodge, the Lion's Bluff Lodge.

References

External links
More information and stories about LUMO wildlife conservancy area

Parks in Kenya
Wildlife sanctuaries of Kenya
Taita-Taveta County